

E

E